Level 3 may refer to:

Music
 Level 3 (Last Chance to Reason album), 2013
 Level3 (Perfume album), 2013

Technology
 Biosafety level 3, a containment procedure for dangerous biological materials
 Keyboard level 3, usually consisting of a set of characters input using the AltGr key
 Level 3 driving automation in an autonomous car
 Level III data of the U.S. National Weather Service's NEXRAD weather radar
 Level 3 charging, also known as DC fast charging, supports charging up to 500 volts.

Other
 Level 3 (TV series), an Australian television series about video games
 Level 3 Communications, an Internet service provider
 An academic qualification, such as:
 Business and Technology Education Council#School leaving qualification (Level 3)
 Level 3 coronavirus restrictions, see COVID-19 pandemic in Scotland#Levels System
 STANAG 4569 protection level

See also